Geferson Cerqueira Teles (born 13 May 1994), known as Geferson, is a Brazilian professional footballer who plays as a defensive midfielder for CSKA Sofia.

Club career

Internacional

Born in Lauro de Freitas, Bahia, Geferson started his career at Vitória's youth setup in 2002, aged eight. In 2011, he signed for Internacional and spent three years playing in the youth academy.

In 2014 Geferson was promoted to the main squad, but made no official appearances over the year. After the arrival of new coach Diego Aguirre, he was named as a backup to Fabrício, and made his debut as a senior on 14 February 2015, starting in a 2–1 away win against Caxias, for that year's Campeonato Gaúcho.

After Fabrício's loan to Cruzeiro, Geferson was made a starter by Aguirre, and appeared in nine matches during the tournament. On 23 May 2015 he made his Série A debut, playing the full 90 minutes in a 1–1 away draw against Vasco da Gama.

In January 2018, Geferson signed a contract with Bulgarian elite club CSKA Sofia.

International career
After representing Brazil at the under-17 level, Geferson was called up to the main squad on 29 May 2015 for the year's Copa América, as a replacement for the injured Marcelo, but Filipe Luís occupied Brazil's starting left-back position as they reached the quarter-finals.

Career statistics

Honours
CSKA Sofia
 Bulgarian Cup: 2020–21

References

External links

Geferson at playmakerstats.com (English version of ogol.com.br)

1994 births
Living people
Sportspeople from Bahia
Brazilian footballers
Brazil youth international footballers
Association football defenders
Campeonato Brasileiro Série A players
First Professional Football League (Bulgaria) players
Sport Club Internacional players
Esporte Clube Vitória players
PFC CSKA Sofia players
2015 Copa América players
Brazilian expatriate footballers
Brazilian expatriate sportspeople in Bulgaria
Expatriate footballers in Bulgaria